The granulocyte colony-stimulating factor receptor (G-CSF-R) also known as CD114 (Cluster of Differentiation 114) is a protein that in humans is encoded by the CSF3R gene. G-CSF-R is a cell-surface receptor for the granulocyte colony-stimulating factor (G-CSF). The G-CSF receptors belongs to a family of cytokine receptors known as the hematopoietin receptor family. The granulocyte colony-stimulating factor receptor is present on precursor cells in the bone marrow, and, in response to stimulation by G-CSF, initiates cell proliferation and differentiation into mature neutrophilic granulocytes and macrophages.

The G-CSF-R is a transmembrane receptor that consists of an extracellular ligand-binding portion, a transmembrane domain, and the cytoplasmic portion that is responsible for signal transduction. GCSF-R ligand-binding is associated with dimerization of the receptor and signal transduction through proteins including Jak, Lyn, STAT, and Erk1/2.

Isoforms 

The class IV isoform defective for both internalization and differentiation signaling.

Clinical significance 

Mutations in this gene are a cause of Kostmann syndrome, also known as severe congenital neutropenia.

Mutations in the intracellular part of this receptor are also associated with certain types of leukemia.

In clinical medicine, there is a suggestion that use of GCSF should be avoided, at least in children and adolescents and perhaps adults, when G-CSFR isoform IV is overexpressed.

Interactions 

Granulocyte colony-stimulating factor receptor has been shown to interact with Grb2, HCK and SHC1.

See also 
 Cluster of differentiation

References

Further reading

External links 
 

Clusters of differentiation
Type I cytokine receptors